Atina Grossmann (born 4 November 1950) is a professor at The Cooper Union for the Advancement of Science and Art. Her research relates to transnational Jewish refugee stories "Soviet Central Asia, Iran, and India: Sites of Refuge and Relief for European Jews During World War II."

Selected publications
 When biology became destiny: Women in Weimar and Nazi Germany. Monthly Review Press, 1984.  (Edited with Renate Bridenthal and Marion Kaplan)
 Reforming sex: The German movement for birth control & abortion reform 1920-1950. Oxford University Press, Oxford, 1995. 
 Jews, Germans, and allies: Close encounters in occupied Germany. Princeton University Press, 2007. 
 After the Nazi racial state: Difference and democracy in Germany and Europe. University of Michigan Press, 2009.  (With Rita Chin, Heide Fehrenbach & Geoff Eley)

References 

21st-century American historians
Historians of Jews and Judaism
Living people
1950 births
Cooper Union faculty
American women historians
Jewish women writers
21st-century American women